The Perth Arms Hotel is a hotel and restaurant in Dunkeld, Perth and Kinross, Scotland. It is a Category B listed building dating to around 1755.

See also
 List of listed buildings in Dunkeld And Dowally, Perth and Kinross

References

Hotels in Perth and Kinross
Listed buildings in Dunkeld
Hotel buildings completed in 1755
Listed hotels in Scotland
Category B listed buildings in Perth and Kinross
1755 establishments in Scotland